Zzzax is a fictional character appearing in American comic books published by Marvel Comics. The character first appeared in The Incredible Hulk (vol. 2) #166 (August 1973), and was created by Steve Englehart and Herb Trimpe.

In-universe, Zzzax was created by accident during a terrorist act. Zzzax is a being of pure electricity who can absorb and discharge powerful currents of electricity. Its size and strength depend on the amount of electricity absorbed. It can also absorb human brain energy, temporarily taking on the personality of the victim.

Fictional character biography
Debuting in the title The Incredible Hulk (vol. 2), Zzzax is a humanoid creature formed from electricity by an act of sabotage at a Con Ed nuclear power plant in New York City. A group of terrorists destroying the dynamos started a chain reaction that caused a rapid buildup of energy, which takes on a life of its own, absorbing the minds of them and several engineers. By using the electrical energy from their brains, the entity achieves humanoid form and sentience. Calling itself Zzzax, the entity fights the Hulk and Hawkeye before being defeated.

The character returns to the title The Incredible Hulk (vol. 2) and attacks a research center in Chicago. The Hulk battles the entity to a standstill before several scientists shut down the process that recreates Zzzax. Zzzax reappears in the title Luke Cage, Power Man, and hunts down the men responsible for its last defeat. Power Man defeats the entity, but not before it kills one of the scientists. Zzzax returns in the title The Incredible Hulk (vol. 2) to confront an intelligent version of the monster possessing the mind of Bruce Banner, but is quickly defeated. Mephisto later reforms the entity in the miniseries Secret Wars II, although the Thing defeats it. In the title West Coast Avengers, the character Zzzax teams with fundamental force villains Graviton; Quantum and Halflife, but is again short-circuited by Hawkeye.

The title The Incredible Hulk (vol. 2) details how S.H.I.E.L.D. captured Zzzax and transported it to Gamma Base. General Thunderbolt Ross arranges for his mind to be transferred into Zzzax's body and battles a new version of the Hulk, whose alter-ego is Rick Jones. Ross relinquishes control of the entity soon after saving his daughter Betty Ross Banner, realizing that his actions had risked lives. Zzzax battles Iron Man in the title Marvel Comics Presents and Cable in the hero's self-titled series.

The entity reappears in the title New Avengers and participates in the mass escape by supervillains from the holding facility the Raft. The title Sensational She-Hulk reveals the character has been contained by S.H.I.E.L.D. After briefly escaping and turning the defense systems of the organisation's Helicarrier against its agents (including the Life Model Decoys), it is recaptured by the She-Hulk.

The Mighty Avengers later apprehend Zzzax when it attacks New Delhi.

Zzzax later appears in the services of MODOK Superior when it comes to him attacking the Red Hulk.

During the Fear Itself storyline, Zzzax was with MODOK Superior when it comes to competing against Zero/One and Black Fog into getting to the Red Hulk first.

Powers and abilities
As a being of pure electricity, Zzzax is able to absorb and generate electrical fields, as well as manipulate nearby equipment. It can grow its own intelligence by draining the energy from human brainwaves, thus becoming dependent upon them. While incinerating the victim, it would temporarily take on his or her personality traits. This extends control to their nervous systems via electric currents. Only its foe, the Hulk has proven unaffected by this ability. Zzzax's size and strength increases in direct quality for the electricity it needs to feed. It is also capable of hovering. At the point whereby water - a primary weakness - could short-circuit or evaporate Zzzax before touching it.

In other media

Television
 Zzzax appears in The Incredible Hulk episode "Raw Power", simultaneously voiced by Michael Bell, Leeza Miller McGee, and Kevin Schon. This version was originally Mitch McCutcheon, a nuclear power plant worker who attempts to aid Bruce Banner in curing himself of the Hulk before being accidentally and temporarily turned into Zzzax after they are interrupted by security guards. Driven insane by the transformation, McCutcheon attempts to siphon energy to maintain his new form until he is eventually restored following a fight with the Hulk.
 Zzzax appears in The Super Hero Squad Show, voiced by Jonathan Mankuta. This version is a member of Doctor Doom's Lethal Legion and briefly joins Pyro and Paste Pot Pete to form "Team Toxic".
 Zzzax appears in The Avengers: Earth's Mightiest Heroes. In the episode "Breakout Part 1", it escapes from the Cube and briefly clashes with the Hulk before escaping. In the episode "Gamma World Part 1", Zzzax joins forces with the Leader, the U-Foes, and the Wrecking Crew to turn everyone in the world into Gamma Monsters until it is defeated by the Avengers.
 Zzzax appears in Ultimate Spider-Man, voiced by Dee Bradley Baker.
 Zzzax appears in the Avengers Assemble episode "All-Father's Day".

Film
 Zzzax appears in Heroes United: Iron Man & Hulk, voiced by Dee Bradley Baker. This version was created by HYDRA scientists Dr. Cruler and Dr. Fump.

Video games
 Zzzax appears in Marvel: Avengers Alliance.

References

External links
 Zzzax at Marvel.com
 Zzzax at Marvel Database
 Zzzax at Comic Vine

Characters created by Herb Trimpe
Characters created by Steve Englehart
Comics characters introduced in 1973
Fictional characters with absorption or parasitic abilities
Fictional characters with electric or magnetic abilities
Fictional humanoids
Marvel Comics characters with superhuman strength
Marvel Comics supervillains